Winifred Barnum (also known as Winifred Barnum-Newman) is a children's author and illustrator.

Early life
Barnum was born in Kansas City, Missouri. Her mother had been a writer and her father had been a baritone with the Lyric Opera of Chicago. Barnum attended a private girls' school, Notre Dame de Sion and the University of Kansas. She was raised in the historic Roanoke-Valentine Road District in Kansas City, Missouri. Her first professional art exhibit opened when she was 15 years old.  At the age of 17 she studied with art Professor Vincent Campanella and noted Hungarian Artist, Frank Szasz.

Books written
One of Barnum's most famous books is Gumwrappers and Goggles, the story of Southwest Airlines' legal fight. In the story, TJ Luv, a small jet, is taken to court by two larger jets to keep him from their hangar, and then to try to stop him from flying at all. Taken to court, TJ Luv's right to fly is upheld after an impassioned plea from The Lawyer. While no company names are mentioned in the book, TJ Luv's colors are those of Southwest Airlines, and the two other jets are colored in Braniff and Continental's colors. The Lawyer is designed to resemble Southwest's CEO Herb Kelleher.

Book adaptations
Gumwrappers and Goggles was adapted into a stage musical, "Show Your Spirit," sponsored by Southwest Airline, playing throughout the Sounthwest and the West Coast including LA, Pasadena, and San Jose.

References

Winifred Barnum's biography at Poohbooli.com

1941 births
Living people
Artists from Kansas City, Missouri
Writers from Kansas City, Missouri
American children's writers